This is a list of bands from Taiwan (not including pop music groups):

 1976
 Cherry Boom
 Chthonic
deca joins
 Dong Cheng Wei
 Elephant Gym
 F.I.R.
 Funky Brothers
 Hello Nico
 Lion
 LTK Commune
Mayday
New Formosa Band
 Sodagreen
 Shin
 Superband
Your Woman Sleep With Others

See also

Taiwan
Taiwanese musical groups